The 2008–09 2. Bundesliga was the 35th season of the 2. Bundesliga, the second tier of Germany's football league. The season began on 15 August 2008 and ended on 24 May 2009.

SC Freiburg were the first team to win promotion to Bundesliga 2009–10 after securing the 2. Bundesliga championship on 10 May 2009. 1. FSV Mainz 05 were also directly promoted as runners-up after a 4–0 home victory over Rot-Weiß Oberhausen. 1. FC Nürnberg defeated Bundesliga sides Energie Cottbus in a two-legged playoff for one spot in 2009–10 Bundesliga and thus earned promotion as well.

Changes from 2007–08
Starting with the 2008–09 season, only two teams are promoted automatically. Two-leg relegation playoffs between the third last team of the Bundesliga and the third team of the 2. Bundesliga at the end of the regular season will be reintroduced.

Likewise, instead of formerly four teams only the two bottom teams are relegated to the new 3. Liga automatically. The third last team plays a two-leg playoff against the third team of the third tier over the remaining place in the 2. Bundesliga.

Teams

Movement between Bundesliga and 2. Bundesliga 
Borussia Mönchengladbach, TSG 1899 Hoffenheim and 1. FC Köln were promoted to Bundesliga after finishing 1st through third in 2. Bundesliga in 2007–08. They were replaced by 1. FC Nürnberg, Hansa Rostock and MSV Duisburg, which were relegated at the end of the 2007–08 Bundesliga season.

Movement between 2. Bundesliga and third-level divisions 
Kickers Offenbach, Erzgebirge Aue, FC Carl Zeiss Jena and SC Paderborn 07 were relegated to the newly formed 3. Liga following the 2007–08 season due to finishing 15th through 18th. They were replaced by the champions and runners-up of both divisions of the 2007–08 Regionalliga. Rot Weiss Ahlen and Rot-Weiss Oberhausen earned promotion in the Regionalliga Nord while FSV Frankfurt and FC Ingolstadt 04 were promoted from the Regionalliga Süd.

Stadiums and locations

Personnel and sponsoring

Managerial changes

League table

Results

Relegation play-offs

VfL Osnabrück as 16th-placed team had to face third-placed 3. Liga team SC Paderborn 07 for a two-legged playoff. Paderborn won both matches on an aggregated score of 2–0 and thus secured promotion to 2. Bundesliga 2009–10, while Osnabrück were relegated to 3. Liga 2009–10.

Top goalscorers
16 goals
 Benjamin Auer (Alemannia Aachen)
 Cédric Makiadi (MSV Duisburg)
 Marek Mintál (1. FC Nürnberg)

15 goals
 Sami Allagui (SpVgg Greuther Fürth)
 Benjamin Lauth (1860 Munich)

14 goals
 Aristide Bancé (1. FSV Mainz 05)
 Erik Jendrišek (1. FC Kaiserslautern)
 Dorge Kouemaha (MSV Duisburg)
 Michael Thurk (FC Augsburg)

13 goals
 Mohammadou Idrissou (SC Freiburg)
 Lars Toborg (Rot Weiss Ahlen)

Source:www.kicker.de

References

External links 
 Official Bundesliga site  
 2. Bundesliga @ DFB 
 Kicker.de 

2. Bundesliga seasons
2008–09 in German football leagues
Germany